Aayiram Jenmangal is a 1978 Indian Tamil-language horror film directed by Durai. Padmapriya and Rajinikanth appear in lead roles While Latha and Vijayakumar in supporting roles. It is a remake of the 1976 Malayalam film Yakshagaanam. It was loosely remade in 2014 as Aranmanai.

Plot
Ravi (Vijayakumar) is happily married to Savitri (Latha). Savitri's brother Ramesh (Rajinikanth) has come from Singapore, and they all go to Ravi's estate for a vacation. And that night starts Savitri's terrible ordeal. An apparition is visible only to her eye; an eerie song and the sound of anklets make themselves heard only to her ears. And before she realizes what is happening, another spirit enters her body, driving out her own spirit!

Overnight Savitri's persona itself changes; she talks, walks and behaves like a different woman. Ramesh is puzzled at the change, and keeps a watch on her. He follows her, as she wanders all over the hills with the easy familiarity of a person who has lived there all her life. He sees her shed tears over two names carved on a tree trunk; the fading legends "Radha" and "Ravi" tell the tragic tale of love and loss. He follows her as he goes to a humble cottage and eavesdrops as she introduces herself to the incredulous old woman (Pushpalatha) as her dead daughter Radha. It was only due to her unrequited love that she was hovering as a banshee so far, she explains. She tells excitedly that in the 5 days before new moon, if she can have a physical union with Ravi even once, she would be alive again. And if she didn't succeed? Well, she would push Ravi down the same waterfall where she had met her end, so that they could unite in the other world.

In the old disused bungalow of Ravi, Ramesh sees a picture of Radha and listens to a cassette as well. He confronts Ravi with the photo, and Ravi tells all- how he fell in love with Radha (Padmapriya), the daughter of the late factory supervisor. They roamed all over the hills, even as the lofty knolls were passive spectators to their love. With steadfast determination, Ravi manages to get his father's (V. S. Raghavan) acceptance. But when he rushes back with the happy tidings, he finds only her body- she had met a watery grave trying to escape from the clutches of her evil suitor Ranga (Kannan). Armed with the facts now, Ramesh thwarts off the attempts of the possessed Savitri's attempts to sleep with Ravi.

The first night she dresses provocatively and sings a song of seduction  in the bedroom. Ramesh knocks the door and pulls Ravi out telling him that there was a call that the factory is on fire. And the second night, he dissolves some strong sedatives in Ravi's glass of milk. The third morning, in the labour day gathering where they are special invitees, the transformed Savitri dances and sings with abandon. That night, she takes Ravi to their summer cottage, but her plan goes awry again when Ramesh sets it on fire.

On the next night, Ravi is returning home when Ranga waylays him to settle old scores and hits him on the head. Ramesh rescues him in time. Of course, that night too passes without Radha's schemes seeing success. The last night, its do or die for Radha, and so she puts the vigilant Ramesh to sleep and lures Ravi out with a soft song of invitation. Savitri's displaced spirit crying out ‘Anna! Anna!’ and the barking dog wake up Ramesh and soon he is in pursuit as Radha sings and leads Ravi up the hill. In the end, good triumphs over evil.

Cast
Rajinikanth as Dr Ramesh
Vijayakumar as Ravi 
Padmapriya as Radha
 Latha as Savithri
 V. K. Ramasamy as Aadiyapatham
 Manorama as Annaporani
 Suruli Rajan as Azhagu
V. Gopalakrishnan as Doctor 
 V. S. Raghavan as Ravi's father
Pushpalatha as Radha's mother
"Mathioli " Shanmugam as Estate Manager
K.Kannan as Rangan Radha's Uncle

Soundtrack
The music was composed by M. S. Viswanathan.  All the songs were written by "Kaviyarasu" Kannadasan.

Reception
The Sri Lankan journal Tribune stated, "Rather spoofy and crispy, this film directed by Durai, cashes in on the popularity of [Rajinikanth] of Thee fame who at his best, is a mere passenger in the story proper."

Original and Remakes
 The Malayalam movie Yakshagaanam (1976) was the original. It starred Madhu, Thikkurusi, Sheela and Usha Nandini, and was directed by Sheela herself.
 Vijayanirmala took it upon herself to direct the Telugu version Devude Gelichaadu (1976), quite naturally had Krishna and Vijayanirmala in the lead, supported by Jaggaiah and Venniraadai Nirmala.
 The producer of this movie, M. Muthuraman, approached City Civil court in Chennai claiming the 2014 movie Aranmanai to be remake of his 1978 horror flick. The court appointed an Advocate Commissioner to verify the claims. Advocate Commissioner on viewing both the movies had stated that the plot, theme, storyline and structure were similar in both films. She also held that the script of both films were the same and most scenes were copied and replayed from Aayiram Jenmangal. The report also stated that the viewer of the film Aranmanai would definitely get the impression that the film is the remake of Aayiram Jenmangal since they had considerable similarities.

References

Tamil remakes of Malayalam films
Films scored by M. S. Viswanathan
1978 films
1970s Tamil-language films
Indian horror films
1978 horror films
Films directed by Durai